The U.S. National Commission on AIDS was established by a statute enacted November 4, 1988, with the aim of "promoting the development of a national consensus on policy concerning acquired immune deficiency syndrome [AIDS]". It produced several reports over the next 4 years.

Creation
In response to the Reagan administration's failure to respond to the recommendations of the President's Commission on the HIV Epidemic (1987–88), Congress passed legislation sponsored by Representative Roy Rowland, a Georgia Democrat and the only physician in Congress, that created the National Commission on AIDS. The legislation specified that its members be people "especially qualified ... by reason of their education, training, or experience" and the commission's membership balanced to cover "the fields of medicine, science, law, ethics, health-care economics, and health-care and social services". Five members were appointed by the majority and minority leaders of the House, 5 by the majority and minority leaders of the Senate, and 2 by the President. The Secretaries of Defense, Health and Human Services, and Veterans Affairs served as non-voting members ex officio. The members were given authority to elect their own chairperson. The commission was charged with producing a report after two years and the President was authorized to extend the commission's life for an additional two years.

The commission began work in August 1989 after several months of delay while members were appointed.

Members
Most members of the commission served for the entire period from August 1989 to September 1993, except as indicated:
Co-chairs
 Dr. June E. Osborn, dean of public health at the University of Michigan
 Dr. David E. Rogers, head of the New York City Mayor's Task Force on AIDS and New York State's AIDS Advisory Council
Others
 Diane Ahrens, Minnesota local government official
 Rev. K. Scott Allen, a Baptist minister, coordinator of the AIDS Interfaith Network in Dallas
 Don C. Des Jarlais, a proponent of needle-exchange programs and a physician with the New York State Division of Substance Abuse Services
 Harlon D. Dalton (August 1989 to January 1993), Yale Law School professor, African American. In March 1992, he described the lack of response on the part of black politicians: "Any high-visibility politician can point to the one time a year where [AIDS] is mentioned. But there haven't been any votes there. Gay black men don't exist, black men don't vote and babies don't vote."
 Eunice Diaz, community affairs director of White Memorial Medical Center in Los Angeles
 Mary D. Fisher, appointed to the commission by Bush to replace Magic Johnson in October 1992 after having both praised and criticized his response to the AIDS crisis. She said: "A lot of people would have me not support the Administration. What good would that do? We need to have people working within the system to make change."
 Donald S. Goldman, New Jersey attorney, author on ethical issues involved in AIDS treatment
 Earvin "Magic" Johnson, Jr. (November 1991 to September 1992), HIV-positive basketball star
 Larry Kessler, executive director of AIDS Action Committee of Massachusetts
 Charles Konigsberg, Jr., director of the health division of the Kansas Department of Health and Environment
 Belinda Mason (August 1989 to September 1991), journalist who died of AIDS-related illnesses in September 1991
 J. Roy Rowland, a physician and congressman, principal sponsor the legislation that created the commission

In July 1992, Johnson told an interviewer that was considering resigning because of the Bush administration's failure to respond to the commission's funding requests. He resigned on September 25, writing in a letter to Bush:

Johnson recalled speaking with the president in January:

Secretary of Health and Human Services, Dr. Louis W. Sullivan, defended the administration's record, citing "increased efforts in research, new therapies for those with H.I.V., and extensive health-care services". Arkansas Governor Bill Clinton, then a candidate for the presidency, said: "Mr. Johnson knows that this Administration has not done anything on AIDS. We've got a good AIDS Commission, good AIDS reports, and no action."

In February 1993, Johnson indicated a willingness to rejoin the commission after President Bill Clinton took office.

Reports
The commission published more than a dozen reports with detailed recommendations.

As required by statute, the commission its first major report called America Living with AIDS on September 26, 1991. Its overall assessment said:

Its principal recommendations included:
 A unified national plan for combating AIDS.
 Universally available treatment for drug abuse and addiction
 Eliminating laws and regulations that prevent drug users from acquiring clean needles
 Medical coverage that includes the cost of prescription drugs for all citizens

Dr. James O. Mason, Assistant Secretary for Health of the Department of Health and Human Services, cited annual budget increases and said in reply:

The commission's final report, AIDS: An Expanding Tragedy, appeared in June 1993 and consisted of just 15 pages plus appendices. Its preface said composing a final report was like "trying to take a snapshot of a tidal way" and continued:

The report saw some signs for hope in the Clinton administration's funding requests, but feared that "the response to the epidemic is again tangled in politics".

Aftermath
The commission ceased operations by law on September 3, 1993.

In her 2012 memoir, Mary Fisher assessed her experience:

The commission was succeeded by the Presidential Advisory Council on HIV/AIDS in 1995.

See also
 Latino Commission on AIDS
 Office of National AIDS Policy
 Presidential Advisory Council on HIV/AIDS
 President's Commission on the HIV Epidemic
 President's Emergency Plan for AIDS Relief

References

External links
 
 
 

Health policy in the United States
HIV/AIDS organizations in the United States
United States national commissions